Mammootty is an Indian actor, who works mainly in the Malayalam film industry. He is widely regarded as one of the greatest actors in history of Indian cinema, As of 2019, Mammootty has won 3 National Film Awards, 7 Kerala State Film Awards, 11 Kerala Film Critics Awards, and a record 13 Filmfare Awards South. Mammootty received his first National Film Award for Best Actor in 1990 for Oru Vadakkan Veeragatha and Mathilukal. In 1994, he secured his second National Film Award for Best Actor for his performance in Adoor Gopalakrishnan's Vidheyan and T. V. Chandran's Ponthan Mada. In 1997, Mammootty received his third National Film Award for Best Actor in Dr. Babasaheb Ambedkar, in which he portrayed the role of B. R. Ambedkar He has also received 11 Kerala Film Critics Awards for Best Actor.

In 2013, in an online poll conducted by CNN-IBN on their website as part of the 100 years celebration of Indian cinema, 2 of his films: Oru Vadakkan Veeragatha and Anantaram were ranked amongst the "greatest Indian film ever". On the centenary of Indian cinema in April 2013, Forbes included Mammootty's performance in Mathilukal on its list, "25 Greatest Acting Performances of Indian Cinema". In 2005, Asianet called him "The greatest method actor to grace Indian cinema." He owned a film production company, Casino Films, which produced several of his films.  He formed a television production company, Megabytes, which produced television serials, the first being Jwalayay. In 2022, he became one of the few actors in India to have completed 50 years in Indian cinema. Mammootty has been honoured at a few international film festivals like the Muscat International Film Festival and International Film Festival of India.

Honorary awards

National Film Awards

Kerala State Film Awards

Kerala Film Critics Association Awards

Filmfare Awards South

IIFA Utsavam

South Indian International Movie Awards

Ramu Kariat Awards

Asiavision Awards

Asianet Film Award

Vanitha Film Awards

Other major honors and recognitions
2020: Vaikom Muhammad Basheer Binale Foundation Award
2020: Critics Choice Film Awards for Best Actor (Malayalam) - Unda
2019: Makudam Award for Best Actor - Peranbu
2015: P S John Endowment Award
2014: Kashmir International Film Festival - Lifetime Achievement Award
2012: Thikkurussy Foundation Award for Contributions to Malayalam Cinema
 2010: Amrita-FEFKA Film Awards for Best Actor - Pranchiyettan and the Saint
 2010: Inspire Film Awards for Best Actor - Pranchiyettan and the Saint
 2010: Vellinakshatram Film Awards for Best Actor - Pranchiyettan and the Saint
 2009: Surya Film Award For Best Actor for Paleri Manikyam: Oru Pathira Kolapathakathinte Katha
 2009: Jaihind Film Award For Best Actor for Paleri Manikyam: Oru Pathira Kolapathakathinte Katha
2008: Jaihind Utsav Awards-Actor of the Decade (Special Award)

References

Lists of awards received by Indian actor